Events from the year 1774 in Scotland.

Incumbents

Law officers 
 Lord Advocate – James Montgomery
 Solicitor General for Scotland – Henry Dundas

Judiciary 
 Lord President of the Court of Session – Lord Arniston, the younger
 Lord Justice General – Duke of Queensberry
 Lord Justice Clerk – Lord Barskimming

Events 
 27 June – foundation stone of General Register House in Edinburgh, designed by Robert Adam, is laid; the building will not be opened until 1788.
 Dundas House in New Town, Edinburgh, designed by William Chambers, is completed.
 Punitive laws against the Clan Gregor are repealed.
 Roman Catholic chapel built on the site that will become St Peter's Church, Aberdeen.
 The Schiehallion experiment is carried by Nevil Maskelyne out to determine the mean density of the Earth.

Births 
 24 February – Archibald Constable, publisher (died 1827)
 26 February – William Farquhar, soldier and administrator in the East India Company (died 1839)
 3 June – Robert Tannahill, weaver poet (died 1810)
 8 October – Henry Duncan, (Free) Church of Scotland minister, geologist and social reformer; founder of the savings bank movement (died 1846)
 4 November – Robert Allan, weaver poet (died 1841 in New York)
 8 November – Robert Reid, royal architect (died 1856)
 12 November – Charles Bell, anatomist (died 1842 in England)
 24 November – Thomas Dick, Secession Church minister and scientist (died 1857)
 Robert Thom, hydraulic engineer (died 1847)

Deaths 
 19 January – Thomas Gillespie, Presbyterian minister (born 1708)
 16 October – Robert Fergusson, Scottish poet (born 1750; died in bedlam following head injury)

The arts
 During this year's harvest, 15-year-old farm labourer Robert Burns is assisted by his contemporary Nelly Kilpatrick who inspires his first attempt at poetry, "O, Once I Lov'd A Bonnie Lass".

Sport 
 Musselburgh Golf Club established on Levenhall Links and the Old Club Cup is played for the first time.

See also 

Timeline of Scottish history

References 

 
Years of the 18th century in Scotland
Scotland
1770s in Scotland